New City is a hamlet and census-designated place in the town of Clarkstown, Rockland County, New York, United States, part of the New York Metropolitan Area. Within Rockland County, New City is located north of Bardonia, northeast of Nanuet, east of New Square and New Hempstead, south of Garnerville and the village of Haverstraw, and west of Congers (across Lake DeForest). New City's population was 35,101 at the 2020 census, making it the 14th most populous CDP/hamlet in the state of New York.

New City is the county seat, and most populous community of Rockland County and the location of the Clarkstown Police Department, sheriff's office and corrections facility. The downtown area is one of the main business districts in the county. The ZIP code of New City is 10956.

Geography
New City is located at  (41.145495, −73.994901).

New City is accessible from major Rockland arteries providing rapid access to Bergen County, New Jersey, Westchester County, Manhattan, and the Bronx in New York City.

History
Before the Revolutionary War, the land that would later become known as New City was inhabited mostly by Lenni Lenape American Indians. The Dutch were the first Europeans to settle in the area. Orange County was established in 1683 as one of the first 12 counties in Province of New York, which included present day Rockland County. In 1780, Major John André and Josh Hett Smith stopped at Coe's Tavern, located on what is now the corner of New Hempstead Road and Route 45.

New City was formed in 1798, when Rockland County was incorporated as a separate county from the south-easternmost portion of Orange County. With the formation of a new county, there were needs for a new county seat. The central location of New City was a convenient location for a county seat, since travel in 1798 was difficult, and the existing main towns in the county were not centrally located. At the time, the Squadron Cavalry of New York City had a summer encampment of what is now the busy streets of Squadron Boulevard and Cavalry Drive, hence how these streets were named. The community got its name because the founding fathers envisioned a "new" city when forming the new county seat.

Other than county and town government, the early downtown area consisted mainly of small retail shops in what was mainly an agricultural area. There was also a county fairgrounds and racetrack located on the Route 304 and Congers Road intersection.

In 1918, Paramount Pictures founder Adolph Zukor moved to New City where he bought 300 acres of land from Lawrence Abraham which already had a large house, a swimming pool, and a 9-hole golf course on the property. Two years later, in 1920, Zukor bought 500 more acres from Abraham and built multiple additions including a night house, guest house, greenhouses, garages, and more. He also hired A.W. Tillinghast to build an 18-hole championship golf course on the property. The land is now currently known as Paramount Country Club. Zukor Park, located just south of the country club, is also named after the producer. Zukor's property attracted a large number of artistic people to the area; including Maxwell Anderson, Henry Varnum Poor, Norman Lloyd, Kurt Weill, Martha MacGuffie, Lotte Lenya, John Houseman and more who all lived on South Mountain Road and formed an artist colony there.

Dutch Gardens, the oldest remaining park in the county, was built in 1934 by Italian artisans, known for its unique patterned brickwork. It was designed by West Nyack native Mary Mowbray-Clark. It was honored as the 1934 Garden of the Year by Better Homes and Gardens Magazine. It was listed on the National Register of Historic Places in 1991. Located just south of the courthouse in the downtown area, it is still one of the most commonly visited parks in Rockland County today.

New City remained rural in character until the 1950s, when the idea of post-World War II suburbia, as well as the opening of the Tappan Zee Bridge and Palisades Interstate Parkway, made traveling between New York City and Rockland County faster, and easier. Many former New York City residents migrated to Rockland, which transformed New City from a quiet rural community to a busy populated suburb of New York City. Along with residential development, business development increased rapidly as well. The downtown area became home to many banks, retail, and real-estate companies; as well as restaurants, shops, a movie theater, bars, and many other forms of entertainment. Certain parts of the town, such as South Mountain Road and Lake Lucille, have been preserved, and remain quiet, wooded, historic old-wealth neighborhoods.

Community
New City has experienced rapid development, increasing by over 35 times in population between 1950 and 1980, yielding a wealthy stable tax base. The downtown area is the county seat, and one of the main business districts in the county, and attracts a large daytime population of workers, residents, and visitors. The neighborhoods towards the center of town are mostly middle class. Located within walking distance from most of New City's main attractions, these neighborhoods are more densely populated than the outskirts of town.

Despite booming development, many upper-middle and upper class residential areas towards the outskirts of town, particularly on the northern side, have remained tranquil and comprise wooded acres, winding roads, stone walls, trees, lakes, and streams. While undeveloped land for development is scarce, a few small farms still dot the landscape.

Restaurants
New City has within its confines a variety of restaurants. Italian restaurants include Rocco's, New City Pizza and, Blu Fig. Japanese food, including Hibachi and Sushi, can be found at Kobe and Mizu. New City Deli is a kosher restaurant that serves deli sandwiches and chicken. Burgers and other diner food can be had at City Line and Burger Loft. Chinese, Indian and Spanish restaurants abound as well, in addition to bagel stores.

Neighborhoods
Braemar, a middle-class neighborhood just south of the downtown area.
Brownsell Corner, a community towards the northern side of town by Zukor Park, north of the New City Condominiums.
Camelot, a wealthy neighborhood towards the eastern side of town that was established in the early 21st century. It is known for its castle-like mansion homes.
Centenary, a community on the north-easternmost side of town, just south of Haverstraw.
Dellwood Park, an upper-middle-class neighborhood towards the northern side of town, south of Lake Lucille.
Downtown New City, the downtown business district towards the center of town. While mostly commercial, it does feature a small amount of residential structures including houses, apartment buildings, and townhouses.
Fieldstone, a wealthy neighborhood on the south-eastern side of town, along Lake DeForest.  
The Hamlets of Rockland, commonly known as just The Hamlets a neighborhood of which one-third is within the New City border, the other two-thirds are in Nanuet.
Lake Lucille, an upper-middle-class neighborhood on the northern side of town, adjacent to the lake of the same name.
Laurel Plains, a middle-class neighborhood next to Route 304, only residential with an elementary school. Most residents work in the Hudson Valley or commute to New York City.  
Mount Vernon Manor, a middle-class neighborhood towards the center of town, north of Omni Court.
Middlesex Heights Development, an upper-middle class neighborhood located between Phillips Hill Road and New Hempstead. The development sits above the town of New City with large elevation changes or rolling hills. Center Hall and Side Hall Colonials are mostly what was built in the neighborhood starting in 1966.   Its streets are primarily named after famous landmarks in US History as well as Notable names. Concord, Lexington, Christopher, Liberty and Yale.  The development also shares a community field for sports and events. It is one of the most desirable areas to live in New City.
New City Condominiums or Heritage Drive, a lower-middle-class neighborhood 0.8 miles north of the downtown area.
New City Gardens, a working-class neighborhood towards the center of town, just east of Omni Court.
New City Park, a community southwest of the downtown area, known for its man-made lake, small town atmosphere, a small business district, and Cropsey Farm.
Oakbrook, a community on the south-westernmost side of town by the Nanuet border.
Omni Court, a middle-class neighborhood towards the center of town.
Phillips Hill Road, an upper-middle-class neighborhood between New Hempstead Road and Main Street. The historic road is known for its wooded natural setting, large stream, ponds and waterfalls.
The Dells, A development on the north side of town, on the east border of Paramount Country Club.
The Promenade, an upper-middle-class neighborhood towards the northern side of town.
The Woods, a wealthy neighborhood on the south-eastern side of town, centered on Westerley Drive and Pepperidge Drive.
Sky Drive, a wealthy, private neighborhood north of Lake Lucille.
South Mountain Road, a two-lane, winding, historic road and former artist's colony on the northern border.
Squadron Gardens, a senior community towards the center of town. 
Tarry Hill, an upper-middle-class neighborhood towards the northern side of town.
Tor Terrace and Smith Farms, a wealthy neighborhood towards the northern side of town located just off North Little Tor Road. In 2009, The Tor Terrace Development received a new neighbor off Pleasant Hill Drive and a new road called Harvest Drive.  The "circle" is still one of its most famous locations for meet ups.

Demographics

As of the 2000 census, there were 34,038 people, 11,030 households, and 9,496 families residing in the CDP. New City is 15.6 mi2 in area. The population density was 842.4/km2 (2,181.6/mi2). There were 11,161 housing units at an average density of 715.3/sq mi (276.2/km2). The racial makeup of the CDP was 85.09% White, 4.67% African American, 0.08% Native American, 6.99% Asian, 0.02% Pacific Islander, 1.81% from other races, and 1.34% from two or more races. Hispanic or Latino of any race were 5.87% of the population. There were 11,030 households, out of which 40.2% had children under the age of 18 living with them, 76.1% were married couples living together, 7.5% had a female householder with no husband present, and 13.9% were non-families. 11.7% of all households were made up of individuals, and 5.2% had someone living alone who was 65 years of age or older. The average household size was 3.02 and the average family size was 3.27.

In the CDP, the population was spread out, with 25.7% under the age of 18, 6.1% from 18 to 24, 26.3% from 25 to 44, 30.1% from 45 to 64, and 11.9% who were 65 years of age or older. The median age was 40 years. For every 100 females, there were 96.0 males. For every 100 females age 18 and over, there were 92.5 males.

As of a 2007 estimate, the racial makeup for the town was now 78.4% Non-Hispanic White, 4.7% African American or Black, <1% Native American, 9.1% Asian, <1% Pacific Islander, 1.4% other races, and 0.5% multi-racial. Hispanic or Latino of any race was now 7.4% of the population. The median income for a household in the CDP was $117,734 and the median income for a family was $128,200. Males had a median income of $62,234 versus $43,028 for females. The per capita income for the CDP was $37,519. About 2.2% of families and 3.7% of the population were below the poverty line in 2007.

Most likely due to the building of the Tappan Zee Bridge, New City has been one of the fastest growing suburbs of New York City, and is still growing today.

Historical markers

 Collyer Farm Pond & New City Park – Collyer Avenue and Lake Drive
 H. R. Stevens House – 234 Congers Road
 The Jacob Blauvelt House, 20 Zukor Road
 Rockland County Court House, 1 South Main Street
 Martinus Hogenkamp Cemetery, South Little Tor Road
 One Germonds, 1 Germonds Road

Landmarks and places of interest

 Coe's Tavern – Formerly at northeast corner of Route 45 & New Hempstead Road – On two occasions Continental Army troops encamped here. Major Tallmadge and his dragoons halted here when taking Joshua Hett Smith and Major John André from West Point to Tappan in 1780.
Contempora House - (NRHP)
 Cropsey Farm, 230 Little Tor Road – This is one of the five remaining vegetable and fruit farms in Rockland County. The farmhouse and its twin, China Echo farmhouse, were built of native red sandstone around 1769 by the Blauvelt brothers and is one of the oldest existing barns in the county.
 Dellwood Country Club (now Paramount Country Club) hosts The Kennedy Funding Invitational, an unofficial tennis tournament that raises money for breast cancer research. Notable players who have participated include Pete Sampras, John McEnroe, Dudi Sela, Sam Querrey, Michael Russell, Justin Gimelstob, Amer Delic, Bobby Reynolds, Kevin Kim, and Noam Okun. Dellwood was once the home to Paramount Pictures founder Adolph Zukor.
 Dutch Garden – Designed by Mary Horgan Mowbray-Clarke, a West Nyack native, in 1933–34 as memorial to the county's early settlers, it won "Garden of the Year" from Better Home and Gardens magazine in 1935. Master craftsman Biaglo Gugliuzzo of Garnerville created walks and latticed walls of Haverstraw brick. Still standing is the Tea House, with carvings of mountains, windmills and other serene symbols representing aspects of Dutch-American history, others of motifs popular in the 1930s – Popeye, the Baker Cocoa and Old Dutch Cleanser maids. Over the years, it served as a site for weddings and for concerts. Folk singer Burl Ives once performed there and Eleanor Roosevelt visited the garden. Markers on site. It is now a county park with a beautiful display of flowering bulbs in spring. (NRHP)
 English Church and Schoolhouse (New Hempstead Presbyterian Church), 484 New Hempstead Road. The first English-speaking church established in the county, organized by English settlers from Hempstead on Long Island in 1734 who wish to have services in English rather than Dutch as in the Reformed Church. Celebrated its 275th anniversary in 2009. (NRHP)
 H. R. Stevens House – 234 Congers Road (NRHP)
 Historical Society of Rockland County, 20 Zukor Road
 Jacob Blauvelt Farmhouse, 20 Zukor Road – A farmhouse of Dutch colonial style built 1882. Contains an open fireplace for cooking demonstrations. The  site also has a museum, herb garden and nature trail. (NRHP)
 Law Enforcement Museum – The walls of the county Sheriff's Department are lined with photos and interesting memorabilia about enforcement in Rockland County, New York City and around the nation.
 New City Library – 220 North Main Street
 Peter DePew House – 101 Old Route 304 (NRHP)
 Pojn Hill – A nickname based on a local legend for Trout Court
 Saint Paul Evangelical Lutheran Church – celebrated 100 years in November 2007
 South Mountain Road – A winding, two-lane historic road.
 Street Community Center Veterans Museum - 31 Zukor Rd, New City, NY 10956. 
 Van Houten Gardens – 241 S. Little Tor Road – Formerly part of the Cropsey Farm. Across the road is a Dutch sandstone house, built around 1769 and owned by the Cropsey family since 1893.
 Vogel Mountain - AKA High Tor Mountain. The highest peak of the Palisades Range. The Southern base is in New City. The peak is in Haverstraw.

Notable people
 Keith Bulluck, (football) Played 11 NFL Seasons, 10 as a starting Linebacker for The Tennessee Titans. Attended  Clarkstown North Rams 
 Tracy Wolfson, Sportscaster for CBS.  Attended Clarkstown North
 Adam Schein, Sportscaster for Sirius Radio. Attended Clarkstown North
 Adam Rodriguez, an American actor, screenwriter and director. He became known for his role as Eric Delko on CSI: Miami. Attended Clarkstown North
 Skylar Astin, actor in Pitch Perfect Corey Baker (born 1989), baseball pitcher
 Julie Buxbaum, New York Times best selling author
 John Masters, author of Bhowani Junction Thomas Morahan (October 11, 1931 – July 12, 2010), represented all of Rockland County and parts of Orange County in the New York State Senate for the 38th district. He was a member of the New York State Assembly from the 96th district from January 1981 to December 1982.
 Hayden Panettiere, actress; in her early life she lived in the New City Condominiums
 Henry Varnum Poor (1888–1970), architect, painter, sculptor, muralist, and potter. Self-taught as an architect, Poor designed the "Crow House" on South Mountain Road for himself, and designed houses or home renovations for Kurt Weill and Lotte Lenya, John Houseman, Burgess Meredith, and Maxwell Anderson.
 Hugo Robus - sculptor.
 Sam Rosen, sportscaster
 Jordan Rudess, keyboard player for Dream Theater

References

External links

 Historical Markers and War Memorials in New City, New York
 New City Little League
 New City Fire Engine Company No. 1
 New City Volunteer Ambulance Corps
 "10 New Reasons to Love New City," by Robert Zeliger, Rockland Magazine'', September 13, 2006 (archieved at 2015-02-03)

Census-designated places in New York (state)
County seats in New York (state)
Hamlets in New York (state)
Census-designated places in Rockland County, New York
Hamlets in Rockland County, New York